The Morse Nunataks are isolated rock nunataks standing  south of Mount Achernar, between Lewis Cliff and the MacAlpine Hills in Antarctica. They were named by the Advisory Committee on Antarctic Names for Oliver C. Morse III, a United States Antarctic Research Program ionospheric scientist at South Pole Station in 1960.

References

Nunataks of the Ross Dependency
Shackleton Coast